Alexander Krausnick-Groh (born March 9, 1989) is a professional Canadian football offensive lineman and long snapper who is a free agent. He was drafted 27th overall by the Saskatchewan Roughriders in the 2011 CFL Draft and signed with the team on June 1, 2011. He played CIS football for the Calgary Dinos.

References

External links
Edmonton Eskimos bio 
Ottawa Redblacks bio

1989 births
Living people
Calgary Dinos football players
Canadian football offensive linemen
Edmonton Elks players
Ottawa Redblacks players
Players of Canadian football from Alberta
Saskatchewan Roughriders players
Canadian football people from Calgary